Frank Carlson (1893–1987) was a U.S. Senator from Kansas from 1950 to 1969. Senator Carlson may also refer to:

Don Carlson (politician) (born 1938), Washington State Senate
Jim Carlson (Minnesota politician) (born 1947), Minnesota State Senate
John Carlson (Minnesota politician) (born 1953), Minnesota State Senate
Martin R. Carlson (1877–1971), Illinois State Senate
Tom Carlson (born 1941), Nebraska State Senate